Hexalobus mossambicensis is a species of plant in the Annonaceae family. It is endemic to Mozambique.

Description
It is a tree reaching 4 to 5 meters in height.  Its petioles are 2-5 millimeters long.  Its leaves are 4-7 by 1.6-3.1 centimeters and come to a point at their tip.  Its flowers are solitary and axillary. Its sepals are 6-8 millimeters long and pale brown.  Its petals are 1.5 centimeters long and cream colored.

Reproductive biology
The pollen of H. mossambicensis is shed as permanent tetrads.

References

Flora of Mozambique
Annonaceae
Data deficient plants
Endemic flora of Mozambique
Taxonomy articles created by Polbot
Plants described in 1958